Water Lilies (meaning "Birth of the Octopi") is a 2007 French drama film and the debut as a screenwriter and director of Céline Sciamma. It won the Louis Delluc Prize for Best First Film at the 2007 Cannes Film Festival.

Plot
The film tracks the sexual awakenings of three 15-year-old female friends in a middle-class suburb of Paris over the course of a single summer. Finding privacy in the solitude of the swimming pool locker room, blossoming teens Marie, Anne and Floriane come to learn the true meaning of arousal and the power of sexual attraction.

After observing a school synchronised swim competition, Marie becomes interested in Floriane, the team captain of The Stade Francais Swimmers. Marie's best friend, Anne, is also on a synchronised swimming team. Anne develops a crush on François after he walks in on her changing in the pool locker room. Marie expresses an interest in joining the team in order to become closer to Floriane, whom the other girls regard as a "slut". Floriane and Marie make a deal; in return for helping her sneak out to meet François, Floriane will get Marie into the team meetings. As they spend more time together, Marie starts to see less of Anne.

Anne becomes resentful towards Marie for ignoring her. Marie tells Anne that she was just spending time at her cousin's. Anne accepts this explanation. Floriane confesses to Marie that she has not yet had sex, despite her reputation. Floriane tells Marie that the rest of the girls on the team make up rumors because they do not like her. In fact, Floriane does not have many female friends.

Floriane recounts instances of sexual harassment she has experienced at the hands of older men. When Floriane asks Marie if she has any similar stories to tell, Marie is quiet and Floriane tells her that she is lucky. After a swim practice, Marie feels affronted when she sees Floriane kissing François. Floriane tells Marie that she is afraid of what will happen if François discovers that she is a virgin.

Floriane and Marie spends the night at a nightclub, where Floriane attempts to find an older man in order to lose her virginity. Floriane then finds a man and kisses him in his car, but is interrupted by Marie. Floriane thanks Marie for the interruption, and later tells Marie that she wants Marie to be her "first", but Marie rejects Floriane. Later that day, Marie meets Anne at a shopping mall, where Anne shoplifts a necklace. When the two eat lunch at McDonald's, Marie tells Anne that she is repulsed by Anne and her immature behavior and leaves. Anne enters the male swimming pool locker room and gives François the necklace, which he then gives to Floriane. Floriane tells Marie that François wants to see her tonight when her parents are not at home. Marie accepts Floriane's request for her to be her "first", and uncomfortably fingers her in bed.

François and Anne later have sex at Anne's house, but François avoids kissing her. The next day, Anne tells Marie that Floriane did not have sex with François, and admits to never have been kissed. Marie kisses Anne, and tells Anne that she likes somebody. Anne assumes that Marie has a heterosexual crush. At a swimming team party, François's attempts to have sex with Anne a second time but she spits in his mouth instead.

In the locker room, Marie and Floriane finally share a passionate kiss. Floriane indicates that she is going back to the party. Floriane tells Marie to 'save her' if the guy she talked to earlier at the party turns out to be 'an ass.' Marie and Anne jump into the pool fully clothed. They float on their backs in the pool together, while Floriane dances alone at the party, oblivious to the effect that her actions have had upon Marie and Anne.

Cast
 Pauline Acquart as Marie
 Louise Blachère as Anne
 Adèle Haenel as Floriane
 Warren Jacquin as François
 Alice de Lencquesaing as Girl in locker room
 Céline Sciamma as McDonalds attendant

Production
Adèle Haenel wasn't doubled in her swimming scenes.

Director Céline Sciamma said she had no trouble persuading the three leading actresses to join. Although, nevertheless, there are a few intimate scenes in the film."In the casting, I told each girl the whole scenario, including that scene in which one girl deflowers the other. You can't just say to a girl, 'if you're naked, that's your character.' No, it's her body. So I was always honest. I said that I would not betray them, that I would not take anything from them, that they should give me something. By itself. If they wanted to participate, they knew how far they had to go. I was surprised that they were immediately excited. But the story was really about them, they felt connected to it. And those parents were just as excited. They even helped me to lie to the government because I had given them a clean version of the script to convince them. The parents supported that story," Sciamma recalled.

Reception
The film received generally positive reviews. Review aggregation website Rotten Tomatoes gives the film an 82% approval rating based on 49 reviews. The site's consensus is: "Water Lilies is a sharply-observed, provocative coming-of-age story that captures the anxieties of the early teen years." Metacritic gives the film an average score of 65%, based on 12 reviews, indicating "generally favorable reviews".

Tim Palmer discusses the film in the context of first-time, debutant filmmaking in France, which makes up around 40% of French cinema each year. As such, Sciamma's film is formally audacious (notably in its minimalism), self-referential (as in the director's cameo as a McDonald's clerk), and very engaged with intimate rites-of-passage, the socialization process rendered through a feminine sensibility.

Home media
‘’Water Lilies’’ was released on DVD in North America and Europe by Koch Lorber Films (a subsidiary of Entertainment One) in 2008. The DVDs are currently out-of-print. 
As of December 2019, the film was released on The Criterion Channel.

Awards and nominations

The film was selected for screening in the section Un certain regard at the 2007 Cannes Film Festival, and won both the 2007 Prix de la jeunesse at Cabourg Film Festival and the 2007 Louis Delluc Prize for Best First Film.

The film secured three nominations for the 2008 César Awards; Céline Sciamma was nominated for the 2008 César Award for Best Debut, and actresses Adèle Haenel and Louise Blachère were both nominated for the 2008 César Award for Most Promising Actress. Eventually the Best Debut award went to Marjane Satrapi and Vincent Paronnaud for Persepolis, and the Award for Most Promising Actress went to Hafsia Herzi for her performance in La Graine et le Mulet.

See also
 List of LGBT films directed by women

References

External links
 
 
 
 
  Water Lilies (La Naissance des pieuvres) at Lumiere
 Naissance Des Pieuvres OST at Discogs

2000s coming-of-age drama films
2007 films
Films directed by Céline Sciamma
2000s French-language films
French LGBT-related films
Lesbian-related films
Louis Delluc Prize winners
French coming-of-age drama films
Juvenile sexuality in films
LGBT-related coming-of-age films
LGBT-related drama films
2007 directorial debut films
2007 drama films
2007 LGBT-related films
Films about puberty
2000s French films